Jintoku Bosai Dam is an earthfill dam located in Gifu Prefecture in Japan. The dam is used for flood control. The catchment area of the dam is 1.9 km2. The dam impounds about 3  ha of land when full and can store 295 thousand cubic meters of water. The construction of the dam was completed in 1957.

References

Dams in Gifu Prefecture
1957 establishments in Japan